Prof Bertram Martin Wilson FRSE (14 November 1896, London – 18 March 1935, Dundee, Scotland) was an English mathematician, remembered primarily as a co-editor, along with G. H. Hardy and P. V. Seshu Aiyar, of Srinivasa Ramanujan's Collected Papers. (It seems probable that Wilson did not know about Ramanujan's lost notebook, which was probably passed by G. H. Hardy to G. N. Watson some years after Wilson's death.)

Life

He was born in London on 14 November 1896 the son of Rev Alfred Henry Wilson and his wife, Ellen Elizabeth Vincent.

Wilson was educated at King Edward's School, Birmingham and then studied Mathematics at Trinity College, Cambridge, graduating MA. In 1920 he was appointed as a Lecturer in Mathematics at the University of Liverpool, and was promoted to Senior Lecturer in 1926. He remained there for slightly more than thirteen years, working under three professors, Frank Stanton Carey (1860–1928), J. C. Burkhill, and E. C. Titchmarsh. In 1933 Wilson was appointed Professor of Pure and Applied Mathematics at University College, Dundee as successor to John Edward Aloysius Steggall, who retired. 

Wilson was elected on 5 March 1934 a Fellow of the Royal Society of Edinburgh. His proposers were Sir Edmund Taylor Whittaker, James Hartley Ashworth, Nicholas Lightfoot and Edward Thomas Copson.

In 1934 he gave a talk Ramanujan's Note-Books and their Place in Modern Mathematics at the third Colloquium of the Edinburgh Mathematical Society at the University of St Andrews.

Wilson died on 18 March 1935 following a brief illness.

Family

In 1930 he married Margaret Fancourt Mitchell.

Subsequent history for Ramanujan's Notebooks
G. N. Watson and B. M. Wilson never completed their project of editing Ramanujan's notebooks (not including the "lost" notebook), but Bruce C. Berndt completed their project in a 5-volume publication Ramanujan's Notebooks, Parts I—V. The following quote refers to the three notebooks involved in Watson and Wilson's project:

Berndt benefited substantially from Wilson's considerable efforts in editing Ramanujan's second notebook. Because some journals require the permission of each author when an article is to be published, for some of Berndt's work he was not permitted to put Wilson or Watson as a coauthor. However, Berndt published several articles with Wilson as a coauthor.

Selected publications

References 

1896 births
1935 deaths
20th-century English mathematicians
Mathematical analysts
People educated at King Edward's School, Birmingham
Academics of the University of Liverpool
Academics of the University of Dundee
Fellows of the Royal Society of Edinburgh
Alumni of Trinity College, Cambridge